Andi Muhammad Guntur (born 31 October 1990) is an Indonesian former footballer who plays as a goalkeeper.

On 29 February, he made his debut for the Indonesian national team against Bahrain. He was brought on two minutes into the game after Samsidar had received a red card, and conceded 10 goals in a comprehensive 10–0 defeat, the largest in the team's history.

See also 
Bahrain 10-0 Indonesia

External links 
  

1990 births
Living people
Indonesian footballers
Indonesia international footballers
PSM Makassar players
Sportspeople from Makassar
Association football goalkeepers
21st-century Indonesian people